Italy competed at the 1984 Summer Olympics in Los Angeles, United States; 268 competitors, 222 men and 46 women, took part in 151 events in 23 sports.

Medalists

Gold
Alberto Cova – Athletics, men's 10.000 metres
Alessandro Andrei – Athletics, men's shot put 
Gabriella Dorio – Athletics, women's 1.500 metres 
Maurizio Stecca – Boxing, men's bantamweight
Claudio Vandelli, Marcello Bartalini, Marco Giovannetti, and Eros Poli – Cycling, men's team road race
Mauro Numa – Fencing, men's Foil individual competition
Mauro Numa, Angelo Scuri, Andrea Borella, Stefano Cerioni, and Andrea Cipressa – Fencing, men's foil team competition
Norberto Oberburger – Heavyweight 110 kg
Vincenzo Maenza – Light Flyweight, men's Greco-Roman wrestling
Ferdinando Meglio, Giovanni Scalzo, Angelo Arcidiacono, Gianfranco Dalla Barba, and Marco Marin – Fencing, men's Sabre team competition
Daniele Masala – Modern pentathlon, men's individual competition
Daniele Masala, Pier Paolo Cristofori, and Carlo Massullo – Modern pentathlon, men's team competition
Carmine Abbagnale, Giuseppe Abbagnale, and Giuseppe Di Capua – Rowing, men's coxed pairs 
Luciano Giovannetti – Shooting, trap individual competition

Silver
Sara Simeoni – Athletics, women's high jump 
Salvatore Todisco – Boxing, men's light flyweight
Francesco Damiani – Boxing, men's super heavyweight 
Ezio Gamba – Judo, men's lightweight (71 kg)
Edith Gufler – Shooting, women's air rifle individual competition
Marco Marin – Fencing, men's sabre

Bronze
Maurizio Damilano – Athletics, men's 20 km walk 
Sandro Bellucci – Athletics, men's 50 km walk 
Giovanni Evangelisti – Athletics, men's long jump 
Luciano Bruno – Boxing, men's welterweight 
Angelo Musone – Boxing, men's heavyweight 
Stefano Cerioni – Fencing, men's foil individual competition
Roberto Manzi, Angelo Mazzoni, Stefano Bellone, Sandro Cuomo, and Cosimo Ferro – Fencing, men's épée team competition
Dorina Vaccaroni – Fencing, women's foil individual competition
Carlo Massullo – Modern pentathlon, men's individual competition
Luca Scribani Rossi – Shooting, skeet individual competition
Fabio Vullo, Piero Rebaudengo, Amauri Ribeiro, Paolo Vecchi, Andrea Lucchetta, Pier Paolo Lucchetta, Marco Negri, Guido de Luigi, Giovanni Errichiello, Giovanni Lanfranco, Franco Bertoli, Francesco Dall'Olio, and Giancarlo Dametto – Volleyball, men's team competition
Giorgio Gorla and Alfio Peraboni – Sailing, men's team competition

Archery

Two time defending bronze medallist Giancarlo Ferrari improved upon his 1980 score, but in the more competitive field in Los Angeles, his ranking fell all the way to 25th place.

Women's individual competition
Ester Robertson – 2435 points (→ 21st place)

Men's individual competition
Giancarlo Ferrari – 2455 points (→ 25th place)
Ilario Di Buò – 2437 points (→ 29th place)

Athletics

Men's competition
Men's 100 metres
 Stefano Tilli
 Antonio Ullo
 Pierfrancesco Pavoni

Men's 200 metres
 Pietro Mennea
 Stefano Tilli
 Carlo Simionato

Men's 800 metres
 Donato Sabia
 Riccardo Materazzi

Men's 1,500 metres
 Riccardo Materazzi
 Stefano Mei
 Claudio Patrignani

Men's 5,000 metres
 Salvatore Antibo
 Heat – 13:46.32
 Semifinals – 13:47.53 (→ did not advance)

Piero Selvaggio
 Heat – 14:04.74 (→ did not advance)

 Antonio Selvaggio
 Heat – 13:55.73 (→ did not advance)

Men's 10,000 metres
 Alberto Cova
 Heat – 28:26.10 
 Final – 27:47.54 →  gold medal

 Salvatore Antibo
 Heat – 28:22.57
 Final – 28:06.50 (→ 4th place)

 Francesco Panetta
 Heat – 29:00.78 (→ did not advance)

Men's marathon
 Giovanni d'Aleo
 Final – 2:20:12 (→ 35th place)

 Marco Marchei
 Final – 2:22:38 (→ 43rd place)

Men's 110 metres hurdles
 Daniele Fontecchio

Men's 3,000 metres steeplechase
 Francesco Panetta
 Franco Boffi

Men's 4×100 metres relay
 Antonio Ullo
 Giovanni Bongiorni
 Stefano Tilli
 Pietro Mennea

Men's 4×400 metres relay
 Roberto Tozzi
 Ernesto Nocco
 Roberto Ribaud
 Pietro Mennea
 Donato Sabia
 Mauro Zuliani

Men's long jump
 Giovanni Evangelisti
 Qualification – 7.94m
 Final – 8.24m →  bronze medal

Men's triple jump 
 Dario Badinelli 
 Qualification – 16.13m (→ did not advance)

Men's javelin throw
 Agostino Ghesini
 Qualification – 72.96m (→ did not advance, 23rd place)

Men's pole vault 
 Mauro Barella 
 Qualifying round – 5.35m 
 Final – 5.30m (→ 8th place)

Men's shot put
 Alessandro Andrei
 Qualification – 20.18 m
 Final – 21.26 m →  gold medal

 Marco Montelatici
 Qualification – 20.14 m
 Final – 19.98 m (→ 6th place)

Men's discus throw
 Luciano Zerbini
 Final – 63.50m (→ 7th place)

Men's hammer throw 
 Orlando Bianchini 
 Qualification – 74.02m 
 Final – 75.94m (→ 4th place)

 Giampaolo Urlando 
 Qualification – 72.42m 
 Final – 75.96m (→ finished fourth but was subsequently disqualified as his doping tests proved positive)

 Lucio Serrani 
 Qualification – 70.64m (→ did not advance)

Men's 20 km walk
 Maurizio Damilano
 Final – 1:23:26 →  bronze medal

 Carlo Mattioli
 Final – 1:25:07 (→ 5th place)

 Alessandro Pezzatini
 Final – 1:32:27 (→ 28th place)

Men's 50 km walk
 Sandro Bellucci
 Final – 3:53:45 →  bronze  medal

 Raffaello Ducceschi
 Final – 3:59:26 (→ 5th place)

 Maurizio Damilano
 Final – DNF (→ no ranking)

Women's competition
Women's 200 metres 
Marisa Masullo

Women's 400 metres 
Erica Rossi

Women's 800 metres 
 Gabriella Dorio

Women's 1,500 metres 
 Gabriella Dorio 
 Heat – 4:04.51
 Final – 4:03.25 →  gold medal

Women's 3,000 metres 
 Agnese Possamai 
 Heat – 8.45.84
 Final – 9.10.82 (→ 10th place)

Women's marathon 
 Laura Fogli 
 Final – 2:29:28 (→ 9th place)

 Alba Milana 
 Final – 2:33:01 (→ 12th place)

 Paola Moro 
 Final – 2:37:06 (→ 20th place)

Women's 400m hurdles 
 Giuseppina Cirulli
 Heat – 57.49 
 Semifinal – 56.45 (→ did not advance)

Women's 4×400 metres relay
 Patrizia Lombardo
 Cosetta Campana
 Marisa Masullo
 Erica Rossi
 Giuseppina Cirulli

Women's high jump 
 Sara Simeoni 
 Qualification – 1.90m 
 Final – 2.00m →  silver medal

Women's javelin throw 
 Fausta Quintavalla 
 Qualification – 57.66m (→ did not advance)

Basketball

Men's team competition
Preliminary round (group A)
Defeated Egypt (110-62)
Defeated West Germany (80-72)
Defeated Brazil (89-78)
Defeated Australia (93-82)
Lost to Yugoslavia (65-69)
Quarterfinals
Lost to Canada (72-78)
Classification matches
5th/8th place: defeated West Germany (98-71)
5th/6th place: defeated Uruguay (111-102) → fifth place

Team roster
Carlo Caglieris
Roberto Premier 
Marco Bonamico
Enrico Gilardi
Walter Magnifico
Roberto Brunamonti 
Renato Villalta 
Dino Meneghin
Antonello Riva
Renzo Vecchiato
Pierluigi Marzorati
Romeo Sacchetti

Boxing

Men's light flyweight (– 48 kg)
 Salvatore Todisco →  silver medal
 First round – bye
 Second round – defeated Gerard Hawkins (IRL), 5:0
 Quarterfinals – defeated Rafael Ramos (PUR), 4:1
 Semifinals – defeated Keith Mwila (ZAM), 5:0
 Final – lost to Paul Gonzales (USA), walkover

Men's bantamweight (– 54 kg)
 Maurizio Stecca →  gold medal
 First round – bye
 Second round – defeated Phillip Sutcliffe (IRE), 5:0
 Third round – defeated Star Zulu (ZAM), 5:0
 Quarterfinals – defeated Robinson Pitalua (COL), 5:0
 Semifinals – defeated Pedro Nolasco (DOM), 5:0
 Final – defeated Héctor Lopez (MEX), 4:1

Men's middleweight (– 75 kg)
 Noe Cruciani
 First round – defeated Paul Kamela (CMR), 5:0 
 Second round – lost to Pedro van Raamsdonk (HOL), 0:5

Men's heavyweight (– 91 kg)
 Angelo Musone →  bronze medal
 First round – defeated James Omondi (KEN), 5:0
 Second round – defeated Kaliq Singh (IND), walkover 
 Quarterfinals – defeated Hakkan Brock (SWE), 5:0
 Semifinals – lost to Henry Tillman (USA), 0:5

Men's super heavyweight (+ 91 kg)
 Francesco Damiani →  silver medal
 First round – bye
 Quarterfinals – defeated Willie Isangura (TNZ), RSC-2 
 Semifinals – defeated Robert Wells (GBR), RSC-3 
 Final – lost to Tyrell Biggs (USA), 1:4

Canoeing

Cycling

Twenty-one cyclists represented Italy in 1984. They won gold in the team time trial event.

Men's individual road race
 Alberto Volpi – + 4:10 (→ 13th place)
 Stefano Colagè – did not finish (→ no ranking)
 Roberto Pagnin – did not finish (→ no ranking)
 Renato Piccolo – did not finish (→ no ranking)

Team time trial
 Marcello Bartalini
 Marco Giovannetti
 Eros Poli
 Claudio Vandelli

Sprint
 Gabriele Sella
 Vincenzo Ceci

1000m time trial
 Stefano Baudino

Individual pursuit
 Roberto Calovi
 Maurizio Colombo

Team pursuit
 Roberto Amadio
 Massimo Brunelli
 Maurizio Colombo
 Silvio Martinello

Points race
 Stefano Allocchio
 Silvio Martinello

Women's individual road race
 Maria Canins – 2:11:14 (→ 5th place)
 Luisa Seghezzi – 2:13:28 (→ 9th place)
 Roberta Bonanomi – 2:15:13 (→ 23rd place)
 Emanuela Menuzzo

Diving

Men's 3m Springboard
Piero Italiani
 Preliminary round – 573.69
 Final – 578.94 (→ 6th place)

Equestrianism

Fencing

20 fencers, 15 men and 5 women, represented Italy in 1984.

Men's foil
 Mauro Numa
 Stefano Cerioni
 Andrea Borella

Men's team foil
 Mauro Numa, Andrea Borella, Andrea Cipressa, Stefano Cerioni, Angelo Scuri

Men's épée
 Stefano Bellone
 Angelo Mazzoni
 Sandro Cuomo

Men's team épée
 Stefano Bellone, Sandro Cuomo, Cosimo Ferro, Roberto Manzi, Angelo Mazzoni

Men's sabre
 Marco Marin
 Giovanni Scalzo
 Gianfranco Dalla Barba

Men's team sabre
 Marco Marin, Gianfranco Dalla Barba, Giovanni Scalzo, Ferdinando Meglio, Angelo Arcidiacono

Women's foil
 Dorina Vaccaroni
 Carola Cicconetti
 Margherita Zalaffi

Women's team foil
 Dorina Vaccaroni, Clara Mochi, Margherita Zalaffi, Lucia Traversa, Carola Cicconetti

Football

Men's team competition
Preliminary round (group D)
 Italy – Egypt 1-0
 Italy – United States 1-0
 Italy – Costa Rica 0-1 
Quarterfinals 
 Italy – Chile 1-0 (after extra time)
Semifinals 
 Italy – Brazil 1-2 (after extra time)
Bronze-medal match 
 Italy – Yugoslavia 1-2

 Team roster
 ( 1.) Franco Tancredi (gk)
 ( 2.) Riccardo Ferri
 ( 3.) Filippo Galli
 ( 4.) Sebastiano Nela
 ( 5.) Roberto Tricella
 ( 6.) Pietro Vierchowod
 ( 7.) Salvatore Bagni
 ( 8.) Franco Baresi
 ( 9.) Sergio Battistini
 (10.) Antonio Sabato 
 (11.) Beniamo Vignola
 (12.) Walter Zenga (gk)
 (13.) Pietro Fanna 
 (14.) Daniele Massaro
 (15.) Massimo Briaschi
 (16.) Maurizio Iorio 
 (17.) Aldo Serena
Head Coach: Enzo Bearzot

Gymnastics

Judo

Modern pentathlon

Three male pentathletes represented Italy in 1984. Carlo Massullo won an individual bronze, Daniele Masala won an individual gold and the team also won gold.

Individual competition:
Daniele Masala - 5469 points (gold medal)
Carlo Massullo - 5406 points (bronze medal)
Pier Paolo Cristofori - 5185 points (11th place)

Team competition:
Daniele Masala, Carlo Massullo, and Pier Paolo Cristofori - 16060 points (gold medal)

Rhythmic gymnastics

Rowing

Ruggero Verroca and Francesco Esposito dominated the lightweight men's double scull during the early 1980s, and they won the World Rowing Championships from 1980 to 1983 every year. Lightweight men's double scull was not an Olympic boat class at the time, and they qualified in the open weight class of the men's double scull, where they reached the A final and came a respectable fifth. Later that same month, they won the 1984 World Rowing Championships, and continued to row in different boat classes thereafter.

Sailing

Shooting

Swimming

Men's competition
Men's 100m freestyle 
Fabrizio Rampazzo
 Heat – 51.71
 B-Final – 51.56 (→ 12th place)

Marco Colombo
 Heat – 52.34 (→ did not advance, 26th place)

Men's 200m freestyle
Marco Dell'Uomo
 Heat – 1:51.67
 Final – 1:52.20 (→ 6th place)

Paolo Revelli
 Heat – 1:53.46 (→ did not advance, 22nd place)

Men's 400m freestyle 
Marco Dell'Uomo
 Heat – 3:55.00 
 Final – 3:55.44 (→ 7th place)

Stefano Grandi
 Heat – 3:56.23 
 B-Final – 3:57.17 (→ 12th place)

Men's 1500m freestyle 
Stefano Grandi
 Heat – 15:22.49
 Final – 15:28.58 (→ 6th place)

Men's 100m backstroke 
Paolo Falchini
 Heat – 58.65 (→ did not advance, 18th place)

Fabrizio Bortolon
 Heat – 59.27 (→ did not advance, 24th place)

Men's 200m backstroke 
Paolo Falchini
 Heat – 2:04.59 
 B-Final – 2:04.64 (→ 9th place)

Fabrizio Bortolon
 Heat – 2:06.46
 B-Final – 2:05.86 (→ 15th place)

Men's 100m breaststroke
Raffaele Avagnano
 Heat – 1:04.09
 Final – 1:04.11 (→ 8th place)

Gianni Minervini
 Heat – 1:04.37
 B-Final – 1:03.99 (→ 9th place)

Men's 200m breaststroke
Marco del Prete
 Heat – 2:18.90
 Final – DSQ (→ no ranking)

Raffaele Avagnano
 Heat – 2:22.90 (→ did not advance, 18th place)

Men's 100m butterfly
Fabrizio Rampazzo
 Heat – 55.70
 B-Final – DNS (→ no ranking)

Men's 200m butterfly
Paolo Revelli
 Heat – 2:00.38
 B-Final – 2:01.58 (→ 14th place)

Fabrizio Rampazzo
 Heat – DNS (→ did not advance, no ranking)

Men's 200m individual medley
Giovanni Franceschi
 Heat – 2:06.76
 B-Final – 2:06.10 (→ 11th place)

Maurizio Divano
 Heat – 2:07.19
 B-Final – 2:06.72 (→ 12th place)

Men's 400m individual medley
Maurizio Divano
 Heat – 4:23.61
 Final – 4:22.76 (→ 5th place)

Giovanni Franceschi
 Heat – 4:23.03
 Final – 4:26.05 (→ 8th place)

Men's 4 × 100 m freestyle relay 
Marcello Guarducci, Raffaele Francesch, Metello Savino, and Marco Colombo
 Heat – 3:25.37
Marcello Guarducci, Marco Colombo, Metello Savino, and Fabrizio Rampazzo
 Final – 3:24.97 (→ 8th place)

Men's 4 × 200 m freestyle relay 
Marco Colombo, Marcello Guarducci, Fabrizio Rampazzo, and Marco Dell'Uomo
 Heat – DSQ (→ did not advance, no ranking)

Men's 4 × 100 m medley relay
Paolo Falchini, Gianni Minervini, Fabrizio Rampazzo, and Marcello Guarducci
 Heat – DSQ (→ did not advance, no ranking)

Women's competition
 Silvia Persi, Grazia Colombo, Carla Lasi, Monica Olmi, Manuela Carosi, Carlotta Tagnin, Manuela Dalla Valle, Laura Belotti, Roberta Lanzarotti, Cristina Quintarelli, and Roberta Felotti

Women's 100m freestyle 
Silvia Persi
 Heat – 57.62
 B-Final – 57.24 (→ 10th place)

Grazia Colombo
 Heat – 59.43 (→ did not advance, 24th place)

Women's 200m freestyle 
Silvia Persi
 Heat – 2:03.98
 B-Final – 2:03.17 (→ 9th place)

Carla Lasi
 Heat – 2:04.60 (→ did not advance, 17th place)

Women's 400m freestyle 
Carla Lasi
 Heat – 4:18.90
 B-Final – 4:18.57 (→ 12th place)

Monica Olmi
 Heat – 4:18.70
 B-Final – 4:19.22 (→ 13th place)

Women's 800m freestyle 
Carla Lasi
 Heat – 8:41.84
 Final – 8:42.45 (→ 5th place)

Monica Olmi
 Heat – 8:45.83
 Final – 8:47.32 (→ 7th place)

Women's 4 × 100 m freestyle relay
Monica Olmi, Silvia Persi, Grazia Colombo, and Manuela Dalla Valle
 Heat – 3:52.89 (→ did not advance)

Women's 4 × 100 m medley relay
Manuela Carosi, Manuela Dalla Valle, Roberta Lanzarotti, and Silvia Persi
 Heat – 4:17.90 
 Final – 4:17.40 (→ 5th place)

Women's 100m backstroke
Manuela Carosi
 Heat – 1:04.77
 B-Final – 1:04.52 (→ 10th place)

Women's 200m backstroke
Manuela Carosi
 Heat – 2:25.45 (→ did not advance, 23rd place)

Women's 200m butterfly
Roberta Lanzarotti
 Heat – 2:14.53
 B-Final – 2:14.54 (→ 10th place)

Monica Olmi
 Heat – 2:18.72
 B-Final – 2:16.47 (→ 13th place)

Women's 200m individual medley
Manuela Dalla Valle
 Heat – 2:20.50
 Final – 2:19.69 (→ 6th place)

Silvia Persi
 Heat – DSQ (→ did not advance, no ranking)

Women's 400m individual medley
Roberta Felotti
 Heat – 4:54.14
 B-Final – 4:57.74 (→ 12th place)

Synchronized swimming

Volleyball

Men's team competition
Preliminary round (group B)
 Defeated Canada (3-1)
 Defeated China (3-0)
 Lost to Japan (2-3)
 Defeated Egypt (3-0)

Semifinals
 Lost to Brazil (1-3)
Bronze-medal match
 Defeated Canada (3-0) →  bronze medal

Team roster
 Franco Bertoli 
 Francesco Dall'Olio 
 Giancarlo Dametto 
 Guido de Luigi 
 Giovanni Errichiello 
 Giovanni Lanfranco 
 Andrea Lucchetta 
 Pier Paolo Lucchetta 
 Marco Negri 
 Piero Rebaudengo 
 Amauri Ribeiro 
 Paolo Vecchi
 Fabio Vullo

Water polo

Men's team competition
Preliminary round (group C)
 Defeated Japan (15-5)
 Drew with Australia (8-8)
 Lost to West Germany (4-10)
Final round (group E)
 Defeated Brazil (13-4)
 Defeated China (11-8)
 Drew with Greece (8-8)
 Defeated Canada (16-9) → 7th place

 Team roster
 Roberto Gandolfi
 Alfio Misaggi
 Andrea Pisano
 Antonello Steardo
 Mario Fiorillo
 Gianni de Magistris
 Marco Galli
 Marco d’Altrui
 Marco Baldineti
 Vincenzo d’Angelo
 Romeo Collina
 Stefano Postiglione
 Umberto Panerai

Weightlifting

Wrestling

References

External links
 

Nations at the 1984 Summer Olympics
1984
Olympics